Hussain Al-Nakhli (born January 30, 1995) is a Saudi football player who plays a defender for Al-Lewaa.

External links 
 

1995 births
Living people
Saudi Arabian footballers
Association football defenders
Al-Fateh SC players
Al-Qala Club players
Al Hait Club players
Al-Washm Club players
Al-Sadd FC (Saudi football club) players
Al-Lewaa Club players
Saudi Professional League players
Saudi Fourth Division players
Saudi Second Division players
Saudi Arabian Shia Muslims